Elide Melli (born 29 November 1952) is an Italian actress. She appeared in more than ten films since 1979.

Selected filmography

References

External links 

1952 births
Living people
Italian film actresses